Saint Ferreolus may refer to: 

Ferreolus of Besançon (died 212), priest and martyr (with St. Ferrutio), feast day June 16
Ferréol of Uzès (530–581), Catholic saint and bishop, feast day January 4
Ferréol of Grenoble (died 670), or Ferjus, Bishop of Grenoble

See also
Ferreolus (disambiguation)